Juna Vaghanya  or Vaghaniya Juna is a town in Bagasara Taluka of Amreli district, Gujarat, India. The town is situated on the northern bank of the Satladi river.

References

Cities and towns in Amreli district